Beiträge zur genauern Kenntniß der ehstnischen Sprache, commonly referred to as Beiträge, was the first scientific journal on Estonian language, edited by Johann Heinrich Rosenplänter and published in 1813–1832.

The text has become public domain. Electronic images of the original publication are available at EEVA.

References

External links 
 Index on Beiträge, EEVA

Publications established in 1813
1832 disestablishments
Estonian language